The Blessing of the Fleet is a tradition that began centuries ago in Mediterranean fishing communities. The practice began predominantly Catholic, but is now practiced by all Christians as a blessing from the local priest and pastors that is meant to ensure a safe and bountiful season.

In most ports, the event was brought by immigrants who held strongly to their Christian religious beliefs. The events that are part of the ritual vary by community and range from a simple ceremony to a multi-day festival including a church service, Parades, Pageantry, Dancing, Feasting, and Contests.

Australia
Most states of Australia have had ports and fishing community traditions of blessing the fleet:

 Port Fairy, Victoria. 
 Queenscliff, Victoria. 

 Stanley, Tasmania. 

 Ulladulla, New South Wales. 

 Fremantle, Western Australia.

United States
The tradition of the blessing of the fleet is spread along the eastern seaboard  and the Great Lakes region.

Gulf Coast
Annual Blessing of the Fleet festivals are held throughout communities all along the Gulf Coast; each year boats parade down local waters to receive the blessing of the priest before the opening of the shrimp season. The shrimping industry has a long history in the area and has
become intrinsically tied to local individual and community identities. 88th Annual Blessing of the Fleet

Brunswick
Portuguese immigrants introduced the event to their new home in Brunswick, Georgia, around the time of World War II. The blessing is held on Mother's Day to honor Our Lady of Fatima, the patron saint of Portugal, and mothers in the parish. The event begins with a morning mass and the ceremonial "May crowning" of the statue of Our Lady of Fatima, followed by a parishioners parade around Hanover Square, adjacent to the church. The procession is led by a Knights of Columbus honor guard and 8 men carrying the statue. The statue's base is decorated with ferns and fresh red (for living mothers) and white (for deceased mothers) flowers. An anchor made of red and white flowers is also placed at the statue's base.
 
The celebration then moves to the waterfront, where shrimp trawlers, freshly painted and decorated, circle the waterfront. The "working" boats are usually matched by an equal number of recreational watercraft.

The priest from St. Francis and the Knights of Columbus honor guard board one of the boats and the priest sprinkles Holy water and blesses each boat as it passes by. During the procession, the boats are judged on their decorations, with prizes awarded to the best.
After the last boat has been blessed, the boats move up the East River to St. Simons Sound, where the flower anchor is laid upon the water in memory of the local fishermen who perished at sea.

Darien
Darien, Georgia, has held an annual blessing since 1968. The blessing is held on the Darien River on a Sunday afternoon each spring, but the date varies. It is scheduled to coincide with a falling tide because a rising tide could drive the boats into the bridge—a reminder that they are always at the mercy of the weather. The celebration in Darien begins early in the week with activities that include an evening prayer service, a fishermen's fish fry, and a three-day festival with arts & crafts, food vendors, many families and kid-oriented events, live entertainment and fireworks on Saturday night. Local clerics of various denominations stand ready on the Darien bridge to bless the boats which then turnaround and move down the Darien River and back into the Atlantic to begin the Spring shrimping season.

Jacksonville
The celebration in Jacksonville, Florida is a simple ceremony that was first held in 1985. While it is held on Palm Sunday, and an Orthodox priest does the blessings, it is a fun, festive boat parade. Some of the participants go overboard with their decorations. Typically, more than 150 vessels participate in the Blessing, ranging from ships to kayaks. This event has also been commemorated in St. Augustine, Florida since 1946.

McClellanville
McClellanville, SC has held The Lowcountry Shrimp Festival and Blessing of the Fleet annually since 1976. The event is held at the fishing community's Municipal Landing on Jeremy Creek in McClellanville the first Saturday of May each year. The Blessing of the Fleet ceremony is an age-old tradition in which boats parade past the dock where the local clergy pray for a safe and bountiful season. As the clergy give their blessing a beautiful Magnolia Wreath covered with Red Roses is tossed into the water in memory of and to honor McClellanville fishermen. This is typically the time of year the boats are preparing for the opening of the season and are freshly painted, cleaned up and looking their best.  The boats decorate for the festival and are usually loaded with people who love to ride in the parade, which is quite picturesque. The remainder of the day is filled with family entertainment, children's games and local seafood dishes, such as boiled and fried shrimp dinners, shrimp kabobs, frog more stew, clam chowder, fish stew, barbecue and more.

Mount Pleasant
The annual Blessing of the Fleet & Seafood Festival in Mount Pleasant, SC pays tribute to local shrimping and fishing industry, offering a boat parade, live music, craft show and many free activities with the picturesque Ravenel Bridge and Charleston Harbor for a backdrop! The festival is held on the last Sunday in April every year. Continuing the tradition begun by the Magwood family, local shrimpers who started the festival in 1988, every year the net proceeds from the festival have been donated to local nonprofit organizations.

Portage des Sioux
The Blessing of the Fleet in Portage des Sioux, Missouri has a 50+ year history and is held each year on the Third Saturday of July in front of the Shrine of Our Lady of the Rivers.

Washington
The Blessing of the Fleet in the nation's capital is one of the premier events of the region's boating season.  Held in the Spring along Washington, D.C.'s Southwest Waterfront, it is hosted by the Port of Washington Yacht Club and supported by several yacht clubs and marinas in the area.  2011 marked the 36th year that the Blessing has taken place.  With activity on land as well as on the water, the event is an exciting display of pageantry and seamanship that draws up to 100 boats each year.

Algoma
The first Blessing of the Fleet celebration is to be held on the eve of the two year anniversary of a large fire that threatened many boats as well as lives of some of the crew. The event is being advertised locally with signs as well as on Facebook. The event will feature a trout boil with a portion of the proceeds benefiting the Algoma Fire Department, and Pastor Chris Jackson will be performing the ceremony. The Blessing of the Fleet is planned to be an annual kick off event, adding to the rich history of Lake Michigan trout and salmon fishing out of the historic port.

Aguadilla 
The city of Aguadilla, Puerto Rico, commemorated its one hundredth anniversary of the Blessing of the Fleet, known locally as El Paseo del Virgen del Carmen, in July 2017. The tradition is an inheritance of Spanish colonialism; in Spain, the patron saint of the fleet is Our Lady of Mount Carmel. The parish of Saint Charles Bartholomew was established in Aguadilla in 1780, adorned by an image of the virgin. In 1917, the first Blessing was initiated by the Augustinian friar Juan de Gorostiza. Festivities include a celebratory mass and procession down the waterfront, followed by a passage of the boats from Aguadilla to a nearby beach.

Notes

External links
 Blessing of the Fleet in Portage des Sioux MO
 Lowcountry Shrimp Festival and Blessing of the Fleet
 City of Jacksonville Official web page
 A slideshow of the Blessing of the Fleet in the Thousand Islands
 Darien Blessing of the Fleet website
 Mount Pleasant Blessing of the Fleet & Seafood Festival web page

Christian worship and liturgy
Christian festivals
Festivals in the United States
Fishing in the United States